M7 Japan is a brand of auto parts and energy drinks.  The lubricant brand is M7 Japan and it was founded in 2006. The brand has expanded its line of car and motorcycle engine oil to semi-synthetic and fully synthetic specifications.  In 2011, M7 Japan started to develop their own energy drink and vitamin drink named Drive M7. The ingredients include carbonated water, vitamins from the vitamin B group, caffeine, taurine, and chlorophyll.

Branding and promotion

Since its inception, M7 Japan and Drive M7 have been involved in motor racing competition such as GP 2 series (support race for Formula 1), drift racing, SuperGT, and MotoGP, including the Aspar Team and the Moto3 racing team SIC Racing Team. Drive M7 has chosen former MotoGP World Champion, Nicky Hayden to be their world brand ambassador in 2014 and 2016 respectively.

References

Energy drinks
Lubricants